(or 4L4Y, Anak Jablay or) is an Indonesian pop culture phenomenon. It is a stereotype describing something "tacky" and/or "cheesy". The Alay culture phenomena spans a wide array of styles in music, dress, and messaging. It has often been compared to that of the Jejemon phenomenon originating from the Philippines, and Harajuku from Japan. Although, the former emerged much later and the latter was even admired in the West.

Etymology
The word "Alay" or "Alayen" or "Sharon Alay" has no exact meaning or obvious derivation. Various definitions of alay are offered. One theory that is widely accepted is that "Alay" comes from the term "" (Indonesian: Kiteflyer), a pejorative describing someone having certain attributes from spending most of their time outside and getting sunburnt (e.g. reddened hair and skin). Kites are also considered as cheap entertainment to the middle and lower class in modern Indonesia, stereotyping alay as a part of that class.

Characteristics

Writing style
 (Indonesian: Tulisan alay) is a form of the Indonesian language that has undergone "excessive leet transformation". Contrary to the popular belief that it is "destroying" the national language, grammatical standards are met in contrast to the modern Indonesian slang language. Similar to the jejebets, alay texts offer an alternative in compressing words so that they are under the 160 character-limit in text messages, often to the point that they are impossible to read. Rules in capitalization are mostly ignored.

Alay text may have originated from the method of making strong passwords for internet accounts, which requires combinations of small and capital letters, numbers, as well as special characters. Normally, to keep the password meaningful and easy to remember, the password would consist of normal words, where some letters are capitalized or substituted with numbers (e.g. the letter a with 4, the letter o with 0). Soon this becomes a habit in writing text in general, and improved with mixing English and Indonesian in one sentence.

Confusing text that could not be understood properly and probably has no meaning (except for the writer), is also considered as Alay Text. This type of text usually contains information of the writer's mood and feelings, it is also common for the text to contain the writer's own philosophy on certain topics such as love, heart break, and relationships. 

According to The Jakarta Post, a high school student from East Java initiated the trend and shot to fame after her writings were discussed in forums and blogs not because they were great, but they were in "code". Her approach in writing attracted a lot of attention, with some people reproducing her writings in forums and blogs.

See also
 Indonesian slang
 Jejemon
 Ah Beng

References

Counterculture
Internet slang
Indonesian culture
Indonesian words and phrases